Ice Shack or Ice shack may refer to:
An episode of the TV show That '70s Show
Ice shanty, a shelter for ice fishing also known as an Ice shack